Nairne is a surname of Scottish origin. Notable people with the surname include:

 Alexander Robert Sandy Nairne (born 1953), a British art museum director
 Andrew Nairne (born 1960), British executive director for Arts Strategy at Arts Council England
 Carolina, Baroness Nairne (1766–1845), a Scottish songwriter and song collector
 General Sir Charles Edward Nairne KCB (1836–1899), Commander-in-Chief in India
 Clayton Nairne (1904-1989), President of New Orleans Public Service, 1964 King of Carnival, New Orleans, LA; Winner of the 1972 Loving Cup
 Edward Nairne (1726–1806), an English optician and scientific instrument maker
 Lieutenant-Colonel John Nairne (1731–1802), a Scottish-Canadian soldier and seigneur
 Sir John Gordon Nairne (1861–1945), British director of the Bank of England and a BBC governor
 Sir Patrick Nairne (1921–2013), a senior British civil servant
 Rob Nairne (born 1954), a former American football linebacker
 Thomas Nairne (died 1715), a Scottish trader
 William Murray, 2nd Lord Nairne (1657–1730), 2nd Baron Nairne

See also 
 Lord Nairne
 Lady Nairne (disambiguation)
 Nairne Baronets
 Sir Nairne Stewart Sandeman, 1st Baronet
 Nairne (disambiguation)

References

Surnames of Scottish origin